People v. Superior Court may refer to:

 People v. Superior Court (Romero) (1996)
 People v. Superior Court (Decker) (2007)